Kyaw Htet Zaw (born Kyaw Htet Aung on 6 September 1993) is a Burmese television actor. He is best known for his roles in television series A Mone Mha The (2017), Moe Kaung Kin Eain Met (2018), Kyal Kalay Yae Kaung Kin (2019) and A Chit Phwae Lay Nyin (2020).

Early life and education
Kyaw Htet Zaw was born on September 6, 1993 in Yangon, Myanmar. He graduated with a degree B.E in Electrical Power from Technological University, Thanlyin.

Career
In 2017, he starred in his debut MRTV-4 drama series A Mone Mha The alongside Kaung Myat San, Hsaung Wutyee May and May Akari Htoo. In 2018, he starred in drama series Moe Kaung Kin Eain Met alongside Si Thu Win, Poe Kyar Phyu Khin, Aye Myat Thu and Htet Htet Moe Oo. In the same year, he starred in drama series Sate Ei Chay Yar alongside Wint Yamone Naing and Phone Shein Khant.

In 2019, he starred in drama series Kyal Kalay Yae Kaung Kin alongside Khant Si Thu and Poe Kyar Phyu Khin. In 2020, he starred the main role of two character Yaung Ni Oo and Moe Thauk Oo, in the drama series A Chit Phwae Lay Nyin alongside Than Thar Moe Theint and Khant Thiri Zaw.

He also acted in film Shwe Moe Ngwe Moe Pyae Shann Phyo, Thel Thel Lote and A Sate in 2020.

Filmography

Film (Cinema)
Shwe Moe Ngwe Moe Pyae Shann Phyo
Thel Thel Lote
A Sate

Television series
A Mone Mha The (2017)
Moe Kaung Kin Eain Met (2018)
Sate Ei Chay Yar (2019)
Kyal Kalay Yae Kaung Kin (2019)
A Chit Phwae Lay Nyin (2020)
Daung Yin Pyan Bon Nabay Mhar Sar Yay Loh Htar Chin Dal (2022)
Kwat Lat Ma Shi (2022)

References

External links

Living people
1993 births
Burmese male models
Burmese male film actors
21st-century Burmese male actors
People from Yangon